System Infected: Backdoor VBS Dunihi is a malicious "worm" computer virus that can infect a computer, creating a backdoor for others to steal information. Backdoor Trojans allow remote attackers to perform various malicious activities on the compromised machine.

References

Computer viruses